Schneckenbusch (Schneggebesch in Rhine Franconian) is a commune in the Moselle department in Grand Est in north-eastern France. The word Schneckenbusch is German for "snails bush".

Geography
Schneckenbusch is a little village in the south-east of Sarrebourg. The village is crossed by a little river, the Bièvre, which rises from the bottom of the Vosges Mountains. Schneckenbusch is too crossed by the Marne-Rhine Canal who opened in 1853.

The commune is situated at 47 miles from Strasbourg, 50 miles from Saarbrücken, 56 miles from Nancy and 78 miles from Metz.

See also
 Communes of the Moselle department

References

External links
 

Communes of Moselle (department)